South Korean boy band 2PM has released twelve studio albums, three compilation albums, two EPs, and thirty-nine singles (including eleven promotional singles and one collaboration single).

2PM debuted with the single "10 Out of 10" in 2008, but it was their single "Again & Again" that propelled them into super-stardom in mid-2009. After the controversial departure of former leader Jaebeom, the group's remaining members were withdrawn almost two months from their usual appearances in variety shows. In November 2009, 2PM made their comeback as a six-member group with the promotional single "Heartbeat" and their first full-length album 01:59PM. The comeback helped them rise to prominence, with both the album and the title track rising to the number one position on multiple charts and earning them the Artist of the Year award at the 2009 Mnet Asian Music Awards. The following year, 2PM released another single and an extended play, "Don't Stop Can't Stop" and Still 2:00PM, both of which reached the top spot on the Gaon Chart. On November 1, 2010, the latter debuted unexpectedly at number 13 on the Billboard World Albums Chart, though no specific promotion for the album occurred in the United States.

In 2011, 2PM debuted in Japan with the single "Take Off", which peaked at number four on the Oricon Weekly Singles Chart. Soon after, they released their second Korean album, Hands Up, which reached the number one spot on the Gaon Chart along with the title track. Both of the group's follow-up Japanese singles, "I'm Your Man" and "Ultra Lover", also peaked at number four, while the latter became their first certified release in the country. All three singles were included in their first Japanese album Republic of 2PM (2011).

In 2012, 2PM released three more singles in Japan: "Beautiful"; "One Day", a collaboration with 2AM; and "Masquerade". "Beautiful" and "Masquerade" peaked at number two and were included in the group's second Japanese album, Legend of 2PM (2013), which reached the top of the Oricon Weekly Albums Chart. Grown, their third Korean album, peaked at number ten on the same chart, ranked sixth on the Billboard World Albums Chart—their highest entry at the time—and was their third consecutive number-one in South Korea.
2PM then released two more singles in Japan, "Give Me Love" and "Winter Games". The latter gave the group their first chart topper in the country. Both singles were included in their third Japanese album Genesis of 2PM (2014). 2PM's fourth Korean album, Go Crazy!, is their only album not to reach the top spot in the country, peaking at number three. The Japanese version of the title track reached number two on the Oricon charts.

2PM reached the top spot on the Oricon Weekly Singles Chart for the second time in 2015 with "Guilty Love", which was included in their fourth Japanese album, 2PM of 2PM. The group's fifth Korean album, No.5, was another Gaon chart topper and peaked at number three on the Billboard World Albums Chart—their highest rank to date. They released another Japanese single, "Higher", which was followed by their fifth Japanese album, Galaxy of 2PM (2016), their first to receive Gold certification status from the Recording Industry Association of Japan (RIAJ). 2PM topped the Gaon chart again with their sixth Korean album Gentlemen's Game, which spawned the promotional single "Promise (I'll Be)". The Japanese version of the song was then released as a single, peaking at number two on the Oricon chart.

Albums

Studio albums

Compilation albums

Single albums

Extended plays

Singles

As lead artist

As featured artist

Promotional singles

Other charted songs

See also
2PM videography

Notes

References

External links
 Official Website 
 2PM Official Japan 
 Official Twitter on Twitter
 2PM YouTube Channel

Discographies of South Korean artists
2PM
K-pop music group discographies